The Farkash Gallery  is an art gallery in Jaffa, Tel Aviv, Israel.

History
Farkash Gallery houses the largest collection in the world of vintage historical Israeli posters. The collection contains posters from time period ranging from pre-state Israel (the Yishuv) to the present day. The collection was founded in 1948 by the Farkash family and is located in Old Jaffa. Today the Farkash Gallery is run by Aharon Farkash.

The collection includes  military posters, political posters, advertisements and movie promotions.

Published works 
 REVOLUTION OR TERROR? VINTAGE POSTERS AND ARTICLES BY LEADING ACADEMY AND PUBLIC FIGURES. Farkash Gallery Publish 2002.

 COLLECTION OF VINATGE POSTERS OF MAY 1ST IN ISRAEL (HEBREW).  Farkash Gallery Publish 2003.
 VINTAGE PHOTOS BOOK OF YOM KIPPUR WAR BATTLES IN SINAI (HEBREW). Uri Dan And Farkash Gallery 2003.
 THE ROAD TO ISRAEL’S INDEPENDENCE, COLLECTION OF ISRAELI MEMORABILIA ITEMS (HEBREW). Haatzmaut Road Publish 2008

 HISTORICAL PHOTOGRAPHS ALBUM OF ISRAEL’S OLD CITY OF JAFFA. Farkash Gallery Publish 2015.

 TEL AVIV, ONCE UPON A TIME, HISTORICAL PHOTOGRAPHS ALBUM OF THE FIRST HEBREW CITY. Farkash Gallery Publish 2015.
 HAIM BSERET The album of Israeli cinema 1913 To 2014. Farkash Gallery Publish 2016

See also
Visual arts in Israel

References

External links
 Farkash Gallery

Art museums and galleries in Israel
Art galleries established in 1948
1948 establishments in Israel
Old Jaffa